Amphidraus is a genus of South American jumping spiders first described by Eugène Simon in 1900. It was previously considered a synonym of Nebridia, but this was later rejected by Jerzy Prószyński, who claimed that merging the two genera wasn't supported by previous diagnostic drawings.

Members of this genus most closely resemble those of Marma and the monotypic genus Yacuitella. All three genera have a projection on the embolic disc that is independent from the embolus and a conductor on the distal retro-ventral region of the cymbium, though it is membranous in Amphidraus and Yacuitella and sclerotized in Marma. Spiders of Amphidraus can be distinguished from these other two by the presence of both a proximal tegular lobe and a cylindrical embolic filament that emerges from the distal region of the embolus shaft.

Species
, the World Spider Catalog accepted the following species:
Amphidraus araripe Salgado & Ruiz, 2019 – Brazil
Amphidraus argentinensis Galiano, 1997 – Argentina
Amphidraus auriga Simon, 1900 – Bolivia
Amphidraus belzonte Salgado & Ruiz, 2017 – Brazil
Amphidraus bifidus Salgado & Ruiz, 2017 – Brazil
Amphidraus boxhica Galvis, 2017 – Colombia
Amphidraus boomerang Salgado & Ruiz, 2019 – Brazil
Amphidraus caziuanan Salgado & Ruiz, 2017 – Brazil
Amphidraus chie Galvis, 2017 – Colombia
Amphidraus colombianus Galvis, 2017 – Colombia
Amphidraus complexus Zhang & Maddison, 2012 – Ecuador
Amphidraus cornipalpis Salgado & Ruiz, 2019 – Brazil
Amphidraus draconicaudatus Salgado & Ruiz, 2017 – Brazil
Amphidraus draconitupan Salgado & Ruiz, 2019 – Brazil
Amphidraus duckei Galiano, 1967 – Brazil
Amphidraus guaitipan Galvis, 2017 – Colombia
Amphidraus guatavita Galvis, 2017 – Colombia
Amphidraus janauari Salgado & Ruiz, 2017 – Brazil
Amphidraus loxodontillus Salgado & Ruiz, 2017 – Brazil
Amphidraus mae Galvis, 2017 – Colombia
Amphidraus manauara Salgado & Ruiz, 2019 – Brazil
Amphidraus mysticetus Salgado & Ruiz, 2017 – Brazil
Amphidraus nigrigenu Salgado & Ruiz, 2017 – Brazil
Amphidraus pae Galvis, 2017 – Colombia
Amphidraus pulvinus Salgado & Ruiz, 2017 – Brazil
Amphidraus quimbaya Galvis, 2017 – Colombia
Amphidraus quinini Galvis, 2017 – Colombia
Amphidraus sacrificatus Salgado & Ruiz, 2019 – Brazil
Amphidraus santanae Galiano, 1967 – Brazil
Amphidraus shenlong Salgado & Ruiz, 2019 – Brazil
Amphidraus sie Galvis, 2017 – Colombia
Amphidraus sikuani Galvis, 2017 – Colombia
Amphidraus simplex Salgado & Ruiz, 2017 – Brazil
Amphidraus somondoco Galvis, 2017 – Colombia
Amphidraus sotairensis Galvis, 2017 – Colombia
Amphidraus sua Galvis, 2017 – Colombia
Amphidraus tanimuca Galvis, 2017 – Colombia
Amphidraus tisquesusa Galvis, 2017 – Colombia
Amphidraus tundama Galvis, 2017 – Colombia
Amphidraus zaque Galvis, 2017 – Colombia
Amphidraus zipa Galvis, 2017 – Colombia

References

External links
Photographs of A. duckei and several other Amphidraus species from Brazil

Salticidae
Spiders of South America
Salticidae genera